Organisation for Counter Terrorist Operations (OCTOPUS) is an elite counter terrorism joint unit of the Andhra Pradesh Police in the state of Andhra Pradesh & and the Telangana Police in the state of Telangana in India.

History
On 1 October 2007, the Andhra Pradesh cabinet approved the formation of OCTOPUS.

Headquarters
OCTOPUS Commando Training Center was inaugurated on 13 August 2012, Andhra Pradesh Chief Minister Nallari Kiran Kumar Reddy at Khalsa Ibrahimpatnam Village near Hyderabad, with 570 acres land area. Before this, they had been based at a makeshift headquarters.

Training
The commandos are trained in handling sophisticated weapons such as Glock-19 pistols, Colt-9 mm SMGs, Franchi Spas 15 dual mode shotguns, sniper rifles, Taser guns and corner shot systems.

On 16 November 2012, tenders were invited for the supply of a sample jet pack unit to the OCTOPUS. Plans have been made to acquire more jetpacks in the future.

Organisation and role
About 100 OCTOPUS personnel have been deployed at the Tirumala Venkateswara temple to oversee the temple security.

Deployment
 October 2013 armed terrorists in Puttur of Chittoor district in the erstwhile AP

After Telangana formation
 July 2017 Muthoot Finance at Happy Homes apartment complex armed robbery.

After bifurcation
Of the 1590 commandos for the OCTOPUS, the force was divided on the basis of options exercised by the staff

See also
 Greyhounds (police)
 Force One
 Special Tactical Unit

References

Andhra Pradesh Police
Non-military counterterrorist organizations
Specialist law enforcement agencies of India
2007 establishments in Andhra Pradesh
Government agencies established in 2007